Luella may refer to:
Luella, Georgia, U.S.
Luella, Texas, U.S.
Luella Garvey House a designer house in Reno, Nevada, U.S.
Luella High School Locust Grove, Georgia, U.S.
Luella Island, an uninhabited Canadian arctic island
 Luella, a fashion label started by Luella Bartley
Luella, a 1983 album by jazz flautist James Newton

People with the given name
Luella Bartley (born 1974), an English fashion designer, magazine editor and former journalist 
Luella Bates (1897–1985), the first woman truck driver (American)
Luella Buros (1901–1995), American painter
Luella Clay Carson (1866-1933), a former university president in Oregon and California
Luella J. B. Case (1807–1857), American author, hymn writer
Luella Costales, American politician and member of the Hawaiʻi House of Representatives
Luella Creighton (1901–1996), a Canadian novelist and non-fiction writer
Luella Klein (1924–2019), an American obstetrician-gynecologist and professor
Luella Mundel (1913–2004), Fairmont State College art department head blacklisted during the McCarthy era
Luella Agnes Owen (1852–1932), an American speleologist and geologist
Luella Weresub (1918–1979), a Canadian mycologist

See also